The Temple of Artemis at Ephesus is one of the Seven Wonders of the Ancient World.

Temple of Artemis may also refer to the following shrines dedicated to the Greek goddess Artemis:

 Temple of Artemis Amarynthia in Amarynthos in Euboea
 Temple of Artemis at Brauron, Attica
 Temple of Artemis in Corfu
 Temple of Artemis in Jerash
 Brauroneion on the Athenian Acropolis
 Sanctuary of Artemis Orthia at Sparta

See also 
 Temple of Diana (disambiguation)